Ro20-8065 (8-Chloronorflurazepam) is a benzodiazepine derivative with anticonvulsant and muscle relaxant effects, which has been sold as a designer drug.

See also 
 Fludiazepam
 Norflurazepam
 Ro07-5220
 Ro20-8552

References 

Designer drugs
GABAA receptor positive allosteric modulators
Fluoroarenes
Benzodiazepines
Chlorobenzenes